Orthocomotis cosangana is a species of moth of the family Tortricidae. It is found in Napo Province of Ecuador and in Peru.

The wingspan is 24 mm. The ground colour of the forewings is whitish, but white in the terminal area and grey in the dorsal part of the wing and between some elements of the markings. The hindwings are brownish grey with traces of whitish strigulae (fine streaks).

Etymology
The species name refers to the type locality.

References

Moths described in 2007
Orthocomotis